Hambrick is a surname. Notable people with the surname include:

Darren Hambrick (born 1975), former American football linebacker in the National Football League
David Hambrick, American psychologist
John Hambrick (1940–2013), seven time Emmy Award - winning newscaster, reporter, actor, and voice over announcer
Judd Hambrick (born 1945), American former Emmy Award-winning television newscaster/reporter
Mike Hambrick, American television anchor and correspondent, two time Edward R, Murrow award-winning journalist
Troy Hambrick (born 1976), former American football running back in the National Football League

See also
Hambrick Botanical Gardens, botanical gardens located on the grounds of the National Cowboy & Western Heritage Museum in Oklahoma City, Oklahoma